Schizocerella is a genus of sawflies in the family Argidae. There are at least two described species in Schizocerella.

Species
These two species belong to the genus Schizocerella:
 Schizocerella lineata (Rohwer)
 Schizocerella pilicornis (Holmgren) (purslane sawfly)

References

Further reading

External links

Argidae
Articles created by Qbugbot
Hymenoptera genera